The grey goshawk (Accipiter novaehollandiae) is a strongly built, medium-sized bird of prey in the family Accipitridae that is found in eastern and northern Australia. The white morph of this species is known as the white goshawk.

Taxonomy
The grey goshawk was formally described in 1788 by the German naturalist Johann Friedrich Gmelin in his revised and expanded edition of Carl Linnaeus's Systema Naturae. He placed it with the eagles, hawks and relatives in the genus Falco and coined the binomial name Falco novaehollandiae.  Gmelin based his description on the "New Holland white eagle" that had been described in 1781 by the English ornithologist John Latham. Latham in turn had based his short description on information provided by Johann Forster who had accompanied James Cook on his second voyage to the Pacific Ocean. Two specimens had been collected in March 1773 at Adventure Bay in Tasmania. The grey goshawk is now one of 49 species placed in the genus Accipiter that was introduced in 1760  by the French zoologist Mathurin Jacques Brisson. The genus name is Latin for "hawk", from accipere, "to grasp". The specific epithet novaehollandiae is Modern Latin for "New Holland", the name given to western Australia by early Dutch explorers. In ornithology the name is used for eastern Australia, especially New South Wales. The  grey goshawk has no recognised subspecies.

Description

The grey morph has a pale grey head and back, dark wingtips, barred grey breast and tail, and white underparts. The white morph is the only bird of prey in the world to be entirely white.

Distribution and habitat
The grey goshawk is found along the coasts of northern, eastern and south-eastern Australia, Tasmania and rarely Western Australia. The variable goshawk was previously considered a subspecies.

Their preferred habitats are forests, tall woodlands, and timbered watercourses.

Behaviour and ecology

Food and feeding
Grey goshawks often seem to vary their prey selection opportunistically. For an Accipiter, they relatively often select mammals such as rabbits, possums, and bats. Other prey can include small reptiles, and insects. However, the most frequent prey type are most often birds. Evidence from different parts of the range shows females select larger prey than males, with males largely keeping to small to mid-sized passerines while females often prey on larger prey such as currawongs, gamebirds (including megapodes) and even herons. Pigeons and parrots are a popular prey item for grey goshawks. Evidence indicates that this species is less agile in the air and less skilled at twisting pursuits over the ground than co-occurring brown goshawks but, on the other hand, the grey species is more powerful and so select typically larger prey. 

Hunting is often done by stealth, but grey goshawks are willing to pursue their prey before catching it with their talons.

Breeding
Grey and white goshawks interbreed freely. They partner for life, breeding from July to December. They nest in tall trees on a platform of sticks and twigs with a central depression lined with green leaves. The female lays a clutch containing 2 or 3 eggs, which are incubated for about 35 days. Chicks fledge 35–40 days after hatching.

The female is usually responsible for incubating the eggs and feeding the young. The male does most of the hunting.

Conservation status
State of Victoria (Australia)
 The grey goshawk is listed as threatened on the Victorian Flora and Fauna Guarantee Act 1988.   Under this Act, an Action Statement for the recovery and future management of this species has not been prepared.
 On the 2007 advisory list of threatened vertebrate fauna in Victoria, this species is listed as vulnerable.

State of Queensland
 This species is listed as least concern in Queensland

Gallery

References

Marchant, S.; & Higgins, P.J. (Eds). (1993). Handbook of Australian, New Zealand and Antarctic Birds. Vol,2: Raptors to Lapwings. Oxford University Press: Melbourne.

External links
Rainforest-Australia.com: grey goshawk
Grey goshawk - Lamington National Park

grey goshawk
Birds of prey
Birds of Australia
Birds of Tasmania
Diurnal raptors of Australia
Birds described in 1788
Taxa named by Johann Friedrich Gmelin